Clavus is a genus of small sea snails, marine gastropod mollusks in the family Drilliidae.

Description
Apart from the general characteristics of the genera in the family Drilliidae, the species in the genus Clavus have a shell with peripheral tubercles, spines or wing-like processes.<ref name="Cheng">[http://s190418054.onlinehome.us/Portal/Turrids/Turrid03.pdf   Chen-Kwoh Chang, Small Turrids of Taiwan, Chapter 3 , History and Taxonomy of the Clavidae; June 1, 2001]</ref> The aperture is rather large. The outer lip is produced below the sinus.

The shell of Clavus is characterised by the following features:— Flat indefinite fasciole, indicated only by the curve of growth lines. A smooth subulate protoconch. An insinuation of the outer lip, near the base, like that of Strombus. A major sculpture of prominent arched scales on the shoulder, and a minor sculpture of dense, microscopic, waved, spiral striae.

Most species in this genus have a dorsal varix. But this is absent in a few species such as Clavus beckii, Clavus humilis and Clavus pica.

G.W. Tryon correctly preserved the genus for smooth specimens with a short body whorl, long spire, nodulous shoulder, no spiral sculpture, a wide, deep anal sulcus adjacent to the suture and, in the completely adult, a marked subsutural callus on the body.

Distribution
The species in this genus occur in the Red Sea, In the Indian Ocean off Mozambique;  also off Indonesia, New Caledonia, Papua New Guinea, the Philippines, Solomon Islands, Japan and Australia (New South Wales, Northern Territory, Queensland, Western Australia).

Species
According to the World Register of Marine Species (WoRMS) the following species with valid names are included within the genus Clavus :

 Clavus aenigmaticus Wells, 1991
 Clavus aglaia (Dall, 1918)
 Clavus alboroseus Horro, Gori, Rosado & Rolán, 2021
 Clavus albotuberculatus (Schepman, 1889)
 Clavus andreolbrichi Fedosov & Puillandre, 2020
 Clavus androyensis (Bozzetti, 2007)
 Clavus angulatus Stahlschmidt, Poppe & Tagaro, 2018
 Clavus basipunctatus (Kilburn, 1988)
 Clavus beckii (Reeve, 1842)
 Clavus berenice (Dall, 1918) (synonym: Clavus spinosa Smith, E.A., 1882 )
 Clavus biancae (Bozzetti, 2008)
 Clavus bilineatus (Reeve, 1845)
 Clavus boucheti Kilburn, Fedosov & Kantor, 2014
 Clavus brianmayi Fedosov & Puillandre, 2020
 Clavus burnupi (G. B. Sowerby III, 1897)
 Clavus cadenasi (Clench & Aguayo, 1939)
 Clavus canalicularis (Röding, 1798)
 Clavus candens (Smith E. A., 1879)
 Clavus cantharis (Reeve, 1845)
 Clavus clara (Reeve, 1845)
 Clavus clavata (Sowerby II, 1870)
 Clavus cloveri (Poppe, Tagaro & Goto, 2018)
 Clavus coffea (Smith E. A., 1882)
 Clavus cygneus (Melvill & Standen, 1897)
 Clavus davidgilmouri Fedosov & Puillandre, 2020
 Clavus delphineae Kilburn, Fedosov & Kantor, 2014
 Clavus devexistriatus Kilburn, Fedosov & Kantor, 2014
 Clavus dolichurus Stahlschmidt, Poppe & Tagaro, 2018
 Clavus ebur (Reeve, 1845)
 Clavus exasperatus (Reeve, 1843)
 Clavus exilis (Pease, 1868)
 Clavus falcicosta (Barnard, 1958)
 Clavus flammulatus Montfort, 1810
 Clavus formosus (Reeve, 1846)
 Clavus fulvus (Hinds, 1843) 
  Clavus fusconitens (Sowerby III, 1901)
 Clavus glaucozona Kilburn & Dekker, 2008
 Clavus groschi Kilburn, 1988
 Clavus herberti (Kilburn, 1988)
 Clavus heryi (Bozzetti, 2007)
 Clavus hewittae Wells, 1991
 Clavus hottentotus (E. A. Smith, 1882)
 Clavus humilis (E. A. Smith, 1879)
 Clavus hylikos Kilburn, Fedosov & Kantor, 2014
 Clavus idae (Poppe, Tagaro & Goto, 2018)
 Clavus infrafusca (G.B. Sowerby III, 1893)
 Clavus infuscatus Kilburn & Dekker, 2008
 Clavus isibopho (Kilburn, 1988)
 Clavus isowai Poppe, Tagaro & Goto, 2018
 Clavus japonicus (Lischke, 1869)
 Clavus johnsoni (Bartsch, 1934)
 Clavus juani Horro, Gori, Rosado & Rolán, 2021
 Clavus kirkhammetti Fedosov & Puillandre, 2020
 Clavus laetus (Hinds, 1843)
 Clavus lamberti (Montrouzier, 1860)
 Clavus maestratii Kilburn, Fedosov & Kantor, 2014
 Clavus malva (Morassi, 1998)
 Clavus minutissimus Stahlschmidt, Poppe & Tagaro, 2018
 Clavus moquinianus (Montrouzier, 1874)
 Clavus nodifera (Pease, 1860)
 Clavus nodulosa (Pease, 1863)
 Clavus obliquatus (Reeve, 1845)
 Clavus obliquicostatus (Reeve, 1845)
 Clavus occiduus Wells, 1991
 Clavus papilio (Kilburn, 1988)
 Clavus paroeca (Melvill, 1923)
 Clavus particolor Stahlschmidt, Poppe & Tagaro, 2018
 Clavus peristera Melvill, 1927
 Clavus pica (Reeve, 1843)
 Clavus picoides Kilburn, Fedosov & Kantor, 2014
 Clavus powelli Kay, 1979
 Clavus protentus Hervier, 1896
 Clavus pulicarius Wells, 1991
 Clavus pusilla (Garrett, 1873)
 Clavus putillus (Reeve, 1845)
 Clavus quadratus (Kilburn, 1988) 
 Clavus rissoiniformis Kay, 1979
 Clavus roseofuscus (Bozzetti, 2007)
 Clavus rugizonatus Hervier, 1896
 Clavus sacra (Reeve, L.A., 1845)
 Clavus similis Stahlschmidt, Poppe & Tagaro, 2018
 Clavus squamiferus Kilburn, Fedosov & Kantor, 2014
 Clavus subobliquatus (E. A. Smith, 1879)
 Clavus subtilifasciatus Horro, Gori, Rosado & Rolán, 2021
 Clavus suduirauti Bozzetti, 1997
 Clavus sulekile (Kilburn, 1988)
 Clavus triantoniorum Horro, Gori, Rosado & Rolán, 2021
 Clavus unizonalis (Lamarck, 1822)
 Clavus velcolorum Horro, Gori, Rosado & Rolán, 2021
 Clavus vibicinus (Helbling, 1779)
 Clavus virginieae Kilburn, Fedosov & Kantor, 2014
 Clavus wilmeri (Smith E. A., 1879)

Species brought into synonymy
 Clavus abdera (Dall, 1919): synonym of Crassispira abdera (Dall, 1919)
 Clavus aeneus (Hedley, 1922): synonym of Antiguraleus aeneus (Hedley, 1922)
 Clavus alabaster (Reeve, 1843): synonym of Inquisitor alabaster (Reeve, 1843)
 Clavus auriculifera Lamarck, J.B.P.A. de, 1816: synonym of Clavus canalicularis (Röding, 1798) 
 Clavus candidulus Hedley, 1922: synonym of Splendrillia candidulus (Hedley, 1922)
 Clavus costatus Hedley, 1922: synonym of Graciliclava costata (Hedley, 1922)
 Clavus crassa (E.A. Smith, 1888): synonym of Clavus aglaia (Dall, 1918)
 Clavus enna (Dall, 1918): synonym of Drillia enna (Dall, 1918)
 Clavus filicinctus (E. A. Smith, 1882): synonym of Horaiclavus filicinctus (E. A. Smith, 1882)
 Clavus flavidulus (Lamarck, 1822): synonym of Clathrodrillia flavidula (Lamarck, 1822)
 Clavus flexus Shuto, 1983: synonym of Plagiostropha flexus (Shuto, 1983)
 Clavus gibberulus Hervier, 1896 : synonym of Drillia gibberulus (Hervier, 1896)
 Clavus inclinata (Sowerby III, 1893): synonym of Iredalea inclinata (Sowerby III, 1893)
 Clavus lacertosus (Hedley, 1922): synonym of Bathytoma lacertosus Hedley, 1922
 Clavus leforestieri Hervier, 1896: synonym of Clavus obliquicostatus (Reeve, 1845)
 Clavus maravignae (Bivona Ant. in Bivona And., 1838): synonym of Crassopleura maravignae (Bivona Ant. in Bivona And., 1838)
 Clavus mighelsi Kay, 1979: synonym of Pyrgocythara mighelsi (Kay, 1979)
 Clavus mighelsi of authors: synonym of Clavus humilis (E. A. Smith, 1879)
 Clavus opalus (Reeve, 1845): synonym of Plagiostropha opalus (Reeve, 1845)
 Clavus pseudoprincipalis (Yokoyama, 1920): synonym of Inquisitor pseudoprincipalis (Yokoyama, 1920)
 Clavus pulchellus (Reeve, 1845): synonym of Fenimorea halidorema Schwengel, 1940
 Clavus quintuplex (Melvill, 1927): synonym of Plagiostropha quintuplex Melvill, 1927 
 Clavus regius Habe & Murakami, 1970: synonym of Drillia regia (Habe & Murakami, 1970)
 Clavus undatus (Hedley, 1907): synonym of Austroclavus undatus (Hedley, 1907)
 Clavus viduus (Reeve, 1845): synonym of Clavus unizonalis (Lamarck, 1822)
Species inquirenda
 Clavus acuminata : species inquirenda Clavus auriculifera Lamarck : species inquirendaThe Indo-Pacific Molluscan Database adds the following species with names in current use :
 Clavus siebenrocki (Sturany, 1903)
 Subgenus Clavus
 Clavus intermaculatus'' (E. A. Smith, 1879)

References

 Montfort, 1810 [Conchyliologie systématique, 2: 434]
 Habe T. (1958). On the radulae of Japanese marine gastropods (4). Venus. 20(1): 43-60, pls 2-3

External links
 KILBURN, RICHARD N.; FEDOSOV, ALEXANDER; KANTOR, YURI. The shallow-water New Caledonia Drilliidae of genus Clavus Montfort, 1810 (Mollusca: Gastropoda: Conoidea). Zootaxa, [S.l.], v. 3818, n. 1, p. 1–69, jun. 2014. ISSN 1175-5334
 WMSDB - Worldwide Mollusc Species Data Base: family Drilliidae